Meegahayaya Grama Niladhari Division is a Grama Niladhari Division of the Badalkumbura Divisional Secretariat of Moneragala District of Uva Province, Sri Lanka. It has Grama Niladhari Division Code 139D.

Meegahayaya is a surrounded by the Madugasmulla, Bogahapelessa, Athala, Kalagahakivula, Katugahagalge, Muthukeliyawa, Lunugala Colony and Naranwatta Grama Niladhari Divisions.

Demographics

Ethnicity 
The Meegahayaya Grama Niladhari Division has a Sinhalese majority (98.8%). In comparison, the Badalkumbura Divisional Secretariat (which contains the Meegahayaya Grama Niladhari Division) has a Sinhalese majority (85.7%)

Religion 
The Meegahayaya Grama Niladhari Division has a Buddhist majority (98.6%). In comparison, the Badalkumbura Divisional Secretariat (which contains the Meegahayaya Grama Niladhari Division) has a Buddhist majority (85.6%)

References 

Grama Niladhari Divisions of Badalkumbura Divisional Secretariat